The Hon. Michael Langhorne Astor (10 April 1916 – 28 February 1980) was a British Conservative Party politician.

Early life
Michael Astor was born on 10 April 1916. He was the fourth child of Waldorf Astor, 2nd Viscount Astor, and Nancy Witcher Langhorne, both Members of Parliament. He attended prep school at St. Michael's, Uckfield, where he was a contemporary of the future writer and painter Denton Welch, who later included him in a short story. He was educated at Eton College and gained the rank of captain, serving in the Royal Artillery (Territorial Army).

Career
He was elected as Conservative Member of Parliament for Surrey East in the 1945 general election. He kept his seat in the 1950 election but did not stand in 1951. He wrote a memoir, Tribal Feeling, published in 1963, and a novel, Brand, published in 1968.

Personal life
Astor married three times:
 Barbara McNeill (1942–1961), with whom he had four children.  
 Pandora Clifford (1961–1968). Annabel Jones, his stepdaughter from his second marriage, married his nephew, William Astor, 4th Viscount Astor.
 Judith Innes (1970–1980), with whom he had a daughter, Polly in 1971. Polly has a daughter, Martha West, with actor Dominic West.

References

External links 

 

1916 births
1980 deaths
Conservative Party (UK) MPs for English constituencies
British people of German descent
Politics of the London Borough of Croydon
UK MPs 1945–1950
UK MPs 1950–1951
Michael
Royal Artillery officers
People educated at Eton College
British memoirists
Younger sons of viscounts
British male novelists
20th-century British novelists
20th-century British male writers
20th-century British writers
20th-century memoirists
British Army personnel of World War II